Tax Receivable Agreements ("TRAs") are legal contracts where a company agrees to share the economic benefits from certain tax savings with another party.  These tax savings may relate to deductions for depreciation, goodwill amortization and net operating losses. 

The first TRAs originated in the early 1990s and TRAs have become increasingly prevalent in recent years. Prior to 2005, TRAs were used in less than 1% of initial public offerings (“IPOs”) but as of 2018, that number had increased to 8% of IPOs.

TRAs are now a common feature of IPOs structured as an Up-C.   Up-C IPOs are designed to generate basis step-ups that allow a company to benefit from substantial tax deductions.   TRAs are typically drafted to require that the newly public company share 85% of the tax benefits it receives from these basis step-ups with its pre-IPO owners. 

TRAs often allow holders to transfer their rights under the TRA to outside investors, resulting in a growing market for secondary TRA investments.

References 

Business
Tax law